Omega Andromedae (ω And, ω Andromedae) is the Bayer designation for a slowly co-rotating binary star system in the northern constellation of Andromeda. Its apparent visual magnitude is +4.83, which makes it bright enough to be seen with the naked eye.

The primary component has a stellar classification of F5 IVe. The IV luminosity class indicates that it is probably a subgiant star that is in the process of evolving away from the main sequence as the supply of hydrogen at its core depletes. However, Abt (1985) gives a classification of F3 V, suggesting it is an F-type main-sequence star. At the system's estimated distance this yields a size of about 2.2 times that of the Sun. This heat gives it the yellow-white-hued glow of an F-type star.

In 2008, the companion star was resolved using adaptive optics at the Lick Observatory. Later observations showed the magnitude difference between the two stars is 3.65 ± 0.03 and they are separated by 0.669 arcsecond. Abt (1985) lists the class as F5 V.

References

External links
 Image ω Andromedae

008799
Andromedae, Omega
Andromedae, 48
Andromeda (constellation)
F-type subgiants
006813
0417
Durchmusterung objects
Binary stars
F-type main-sequence stars